St John's Town may refer to:

 St John's Town of Dalry, Scotland
 An old name for Perth, Scotland

See also 
Saint Johnstown (disambiguation)